Ellie Gavalas (born 25 March 1996) is an Australian rules footballer playing for the North Melbourne Football Club in the AFL Women's (AFLW). Gavalas was drafted by North Melbourne with their first selection and tenth overall in the 2019 AFL Women's draft. She made her debut against  at Casey Fields in the opening round of the 2020 season. It was revealed she signed on with the club for two more seasons on 17 June 2021, tying her to the club until the end of 2023.

Career
Gavalas grew up playing soccer and played for the Tasmanian state representative team and the Matildas under-17 national team. She made the switch to Australian rules in 2018, playing for Marcellin in the VAFA. Gavalas was named in the 2019 VFLW team of the year playing for the Western Bulldogs. She was also named the Bulldogs' player of the year.

References

External links

1996 births
Living people
North Melbourne Football Club (AFLW) players
Australian rules footballers from Hobart